{{DISPLAYTITLE:C15H10O3}}
The molecular formula C15H10O3 (molar mass: 238.24 g/mol, exact mass: 238.0630 u) may refer to:

 3-hydroxyflavone, a flavonol
 6-hydroxyflavone, a flavone

Molecular formulas